Angelo, Tyrant of Padua is an 1835 play by the French writer Victor Hugo. It is a historical work on podestà Angelo, set in Padua in northern Italy. It was a return to the theatre for Hugo, whose previous work Marie Tudor had been a failure.

Adaptations
The play has been adapted into a number of different works including:
 Il giuramento, an 1837 opera composed by Saverio Mercadante
 Angelo, an 1876 opera composed by César Cui
 La Gioconda, an 1876 opera composed by Amilcare Ponchielli
 Angelo, Tyrant of Padua, a 1928 opera composed by  Alfred Bruneau
 The Tyrant of Padua, a 1946 Italian film directed by Max Neufeld

References

Bibliography
 Berlanstein, Lenard R. Daughters of Eve: A Cultural History of French Theater Women from the Old Regime to the Fin de Siècle. Harvard University Press, 2009.
 Stanton, Sarah &  Barnham, Marting. The Cambridge Paperback Guide to Theatre. Cambridge University Press, 1996.

1835 plays
French plays adapted into films
Plays set in Italy
Plays by Victor Hugo
Plays adapted into operas